Clanoneurum cimiciforme is a species of fly in the family Ephydridae. It is found in the Palearctic.

Distribution
Belgium, Bulgaria, Czech Republic, Canary Islands, Egypt, France, Italy

References

Ephydridae
Insects described in 1855
Diptera of Europe
Diptera of Africa
Taxa named by Alexander Henry Haliday